Ron Simons is an American actor and producer, and a four-time Tony Award winner.

Career
Simons has degrees in theater and computer science from Columbia University, and didn't go to drama school until he was 39. He also received a degree from Columbia Business School. He had wanted to go into acting since high school, but was unable to due to his living circumstances. "[A]s the only member of my family to have graduated college with retired grandparents and a mom who had me at a slightly older age, I felt the need to become the family breadwinner." He finally quit corporate business to enter film business at the age of 47. He further expanded into producing despite not being fully aware of what that position entailed. He would end up producing films such as Gun Hill Road and Blue Caprice, but continue to act in projects along the way.

In 2009 he founded SimonSays Entertainment; a production company that works to create film, television and stage productions that revolve around various minority focused subjects from race, LGBT, disabled, women and elder people.

In April 2022, he was named the commencement speaker for the University of Washington. He is a 2018 recipient of Columbia College's John Jay Award.

Filmography

Selected filmography (as producer)
 Night Catches Us (2010)
 Gun Hill Road (2011)
 Blue Caprice (2013)

References

External links

Living people
Year of birth missing (living people)
American male film actors
American male television actors
Place of birth missing (living people)
Columbia College (New York) alumni
Columbia Business School alumni